John Fellowes Lewis (born 22 May 1953) is a former Australian rules footballer, who played for the Fitzroy Football Club in the Victorian Football League (VFL). He later played with Geelong West in the Victorian Football Association (VFA).

References

External links

1953 births
Living people
Fitzroy Football Club players
Warrnambool Football Club players
Geelong West Football Club players
Australian rules footballers from Victoria (Australia)